Emma Hopkins  is a British diplomat who since October 2020 has been the British Ambassador to Denmark, and was previously the British Ambassador to Bulgaria from  May 2015 to August 2020.

Personal life

Hopkins graduated with a degree in Law from the University of Cambridge. She was called to the Bar in 1995 and practised as a barrister until 2001 when she entered public service.

She is married to Steven Hopkins and they have two young daughters.

Career

Hopkins joined the UK civil service in 2001. She  led the UK government's Preventing Sexual Violence Initiative (PSVI) to end impunity for sexual violence committed in war. The campaign included the Global Summit to End Sexual Violence in Conflict – which brought together over 125 countries in the largest gathering ever on this topic. She was awarded the Officer of the Most Excellent Order of the British Empire (OBE) in the 2014 Queen's Birthday Honours List, for services to preventing sexual violence in conflict affected countries.

Hopkins was appointed as Her Majesty's Ambassador to Denmark in January 2020, and took up her post in October 2020.

References

Ambassadors of the United Kingdom to Bulgaria
Alumni of the University of Cambridge
Living people
Year of birth missing (living people)
British women ambassadors
Officers of the Order of the British Empire